The New Zealand women's national cricket team toured England in August 2008. They played England in 3 Twenty20 Internationals and 6 One Day Internationals. New Zealand won the ODI series 3–2, whilst England won the T20I series 2–1. They also played a T20I against South Africa, who were also touring England that summer, which they won by 97 runs.

Squads

Tour Matches

50-over match: Marylebone Cricket Club v New Zealand

20-over match: England Development Squad v New Zealand

Only T20I: New Zealand v South Africa

WT20I Series

1st T20

2nd T20

3rd T20

WODI Series

1st ODI

2nd ODI

3rd ODI

4th ODI

5th ODI

6th ODI

References

External links
New Zealand Women tour of England 2007 from Cricinfo

International cricket competitions in 2007
2007 in women's cricket
Women's cricket tours of England
New Zealand women's national cricket team tours